Depressizona is a genus of small to minute sea snails, marine gastropod molluscs or micromolluscs in the superfamily Scissurelloidea.

Depressizona is the only genus within the family Depressizonidae.

Depressizonidae was described as the subfamily Depressizoninae Geiger, 2003, in 2003. Then in 2005 it was considered to be a synonym of Scissurellinae in the family Scissurellidae according to the taxonomy of Bouchet & Roctoi (2005) and it has also been placed in Scissurellidae. In 2009 it was updated to the family level, Depressizonidae, when the second known species Depressizona axiosculpta was described.

Species
Genus Depressizona contains two species only:
 Depressizona axiosculpta Geiger, 2009 It was described from only one specimen in poor condition known from Tonga. Geiger (2012) illustrated a second specimen in much better condition.
 Depressizona exorum Geiger, 2003 - from Easter Island. Type species of the genus Depressizona.

Description 
The shape of the shell is calyptraeiform.

References

 Geiger D.L. (2012) Monograph of the little slit shells. Volume 1. Introduction, Scissurellidae. pp. 1-728. Volume 2. Anatomidae, Larocheidae, Depressizonidae, Sutilizonidae, Temnocinclidae. pp. 729–1291. Santa Barbara Museum of Natural History Monographs Number 7.

External links

Depressizonidae